is a former Japanese football player.

Playing career
Inoue was born in Osaka Prefecture on October 5, 1978. He joined the J1 League club JEF United Ichihara as part of the youth team in 1997. He played as defensive midfielder during the first season. However he did not play as much in 1998. In 2000, he moved to the J2 League club Albirex Niigata. He became a regular player as right side back and played there for two seasons. In 2002, he moved to the Japan Football League club Sagawa Express Tokyo. He played often for five seasons and retired at the end of the 2006 season.

Club statistics

References

External links

1978 births
Living people
Association football people from Osaka Prefecture
Japanese footballers
J1 League players
J2 League players
Japan Football League players
JEF United Chiba players
Albirex Niigata players
Sagawa Shiga FC players
Association football defenders